Prince William was built in Newcastle in 1788. She then traded between England and the Baltic. The Royal Navy first hired her in 1797. His Majesty's hired armed ship Prince William served on two contracts, one during the French Revolutionary Wars and one during the Napoleonic Wars. The Admiralty returned her to her owners at the end of each contract.

Merchantman
Prince William first appeared in Lloyd's Register (LR) in 1789. That volume showed her burthen as 350 tons; by 1791 the burthen had been corrected to 306 tons. (There is no readily accessible online volume for 1788).

Britain's trade provided a lucrative target for French privateers so the Admiralty hired a number of merchant vessels, armed them, and then used them for convoy escort duties.

First contract (1797–1801)
Prince William served from 24 April 1797 to 26 November 1801.  Her captain was Commander Thomas Whitwronge Clayton, her master was W. Nicholson, and she served on the North Sea station.

In 1797, Prince William, under Clayton's command, recaptured London Packet, of Aberdeen. At the time Prince William was employed in convoying vessels. The French privateer Jason had captured London Packet in the North Sea off Buchan Ness, Aberdeenshire, on 11 September 1797. She had been on a voyage from Archangelsk, Russia to Portsmouth.

Clayton received promotion to post captain on 26 December 1799.

On 26 October 1801 it was announced at Hull that the hired armed ships Prince William, and Pomona were to be paid off at Newcastle following the signing of a peace treaty at Amiens; hostilities officially had ceased on 22 October. The Admiralty returned Prince William to her owners on 21 November.

On 29 April 1802 Richbell received promotion to post captain. An amateur artist, Captain Richbell drew a picture, A view of Scarborough with His Majesty's armed ship Prince William, anchoring in a fresh gale that in 1803 he exhibited at the Royal Academy of Arts.

In November 1802 Lloyd's List reported that Prince William, Wiggins, master, had gotten on shore at Memel but was expected to be gotten off.

Second contract (1804–1812)
Prince William served from 3 May 1804 to 2 November 1812.

A report from Hull dated 24 September 1804 stated that Captain John Waller of the Sea Fencibles had been appointed to command Prince William. Captain Mackay was to move from Prince William to His Majesty's armed ship Royalist, then in Hull Roads. Commander John Waller commissioned  in January 1805, and so must have left Prince William within months of his appointment to her.

On 1 December 1806 Prince William arrived at Grimsby with a convoy from the Elbe. Prince William had also captured six prizes with goods from Hamburg and Bordeaux.

On 23 August 1807, Prince William was under the command of Captain Andrew Mott when she captured the St. Jurgen. St Sorgen, Joryensen, master, was a Danish ship carrying wine and brandy. In October Prince William detained St George, Jorgenson, master, which was carrying wine and brandy.

On 19 June 1810, Prince William, still under Mott's command, captured the Danish privateer Swalen, Hermansen, master.

Prince William, together with the 74-gun , the ship-sloop , and the brig-sloop  left Göteborg on 18 December 1811 as escorts to a convoy of 15 transports and a fleet of merchantmen, some 120 sail or more. Four or five days later Egeria and Prince William separated, together with the vessels going to the Humber and Scotland, including most of the merchant vessels. The transports and a handful of the merchantmen proceeded with Hero and Grasshopper. On 24 December Hero wrecked off Texel in a storm with the loss of all but 12 men of her 600-man crew. Grasshopper became trapped about a mile away and was forced to strike to the Batavian Republic.

Fate
On 19 April 1812 the armed ship Prince William sailed from Plymouth with a convoy for the Downs. Thereafter she disappears from online sources. Commander Andrew Mott was promoted to post captain in August 1812.

Notes

Citations

References

 
 
}

 
  

1788 ships
Age of Sail merchant ships of England
Hired armed vessels of the Royal Navy